Katy Kale is an American government official, serving as the Deputy Administrator at U.S. General Services Administration; she served as the Acting Administrator of the General Services Administration in the Biden administration prior to Robin Carnahan's nomination and Senate confirmation as Administrator.

Early life and education 
Kale is a native of Massachusetts and earned a Bachelor of Arts degree in political science from George Mason University.

Career 
During the Obama administration, Kale served as chief of staff of the General Services Administration and assistant to the president for management and administration. She was also a member of the White House Council on Women and Girls. Kale was a volunteer on the Biden–Harris transition team.

References 

Living people
Biden administration personnel
Obama administration personnel
Administrators of the General Services Administration
George Mason University alumni
People from Massachusetts
Year of birth missing (living people)